Peter R. Fisher (born 1956, Washington D.C.) is a senior lecturer at the Tuck School of Business at Dartmouth College, and a senior fellow at the Tuck Center for Global Business and Government. He is also a former executive at BlackRock and a former senior official at the U.S. Treasury and the Federal Reserve.

Early life
Fisher is the son of Roger D. Fisher and Caroline (Speer) Fisher and the brother of Elliott S. Fisher.  He is married and the father of two.  He was born in Washington D.C. in 1956.  His family moved to Cambridge, Massachusetts, in 1958 when his father first joined the faculty of Harvard Law School.

Education

Fisher was educated at the Shady Hill School (1960-1971) and Concord Academy (1971-1974) in Massachusetts.  He graduated from Harvard College with a B.A. in history in 1980 and from the Harvard Law School with a J.D. in 1985.

Career

After law school, he joined the Federal Reserve Bank of New York legal department in 1985, where he served until 1989.  From 1989 to 1990 Fisher was seconded to the Bank for International Settlements, in Basel, Switzerland, where he served as the secretary of the committee on inter-bank netting schemes of the Central Banks of the G-10 countries.

In 1990, he joined the foreign exchange department of the New York Fed. From 1995 to 2001, he served as executive vice president of the New York Fed and as manager of the system open market account, responsible to the federal open market committee of the Federal Reserve System for the conduct of domestic monetary and foreign currency operations.   In 1998, Fisher played a catalytic role in the resolution of the long-term capital management hedge fund.

From 2001 to 2003, he served as under secretary of the U.S. Treasury for domestic finance. While at the Treasury, Fisher served a member of the board of the Securities Investor Protection Corporation (SIPC), on the Air Transportation Stabilization Board (ATSB), established by Congress after the events of September 11, 2001 and as the Treasury representative to the Pension Benefit Guaranty Corporation (PBGC).

In 2004, Fisher joined the asset management firm BlackRock.  From 2005 to 2007, he served as chairman of BlackRock Asia.  In 2007, he became co-head, and in 2009 the head, of BlackRock’s Fixed Income Portfolio Management Group.  In 2013, he stepped down as head of the fixed income and serves as a senior director of the BlackRock investment institute.

From 2007 to 2013, he served as non-executive director of the Financial Services Authority of the United Kingdom.  He is a recipient of the distinguished service award from the Bond Market Association (2004), the Alexander Hamilton medal, U.S. Department of the Treasury (2003), and the Postmaster General’s partnership for progress award, United States Postal Service (2002).

References

Living people
United States Department of the Treasury officials
Harvard Law School alumni
Harvard College alumni
1956 births
Concord Academy alumni
Peterson Institute for International Economics
Shady Hill School alumni